The Vagabond 17 is an American trailerable sailboat that was designed by Ron Holder as a pocket cruiser and first built in 1976.

The design was developed into the Holder 17 in 1982.

Production
The design was built by Vagabond Boats in the United States. A total of 400 boats were built, but it is now out of production.

Design
The Vagabond 17 is a recreational keelboat, built predominantly of fiberglass, with teak wood trim. It has a fractional sloop rig with aluminum spars. The hull has a raked stem, a vertical transom, a transom-hung rudder controlled by a tiller and a locking swing keel. It displaces  and carries  of ballast.

The design has sleeping accommodation for four people, with a split double "V"-berth in the bow and two quarter berths in the main cabin. The galley includes a sink and water tank. The head is located behind a partial bulkhead.

For sailing the design can be equipped with a 150% genoa and optional winches for handling it. There is a bow-mounted stainless steel pulpit and the hull is equipped with positive flotation.

Operational history
In a 1994 review Richard Sherwood described the design as, "a little overnighter".

A Sailrite review noted, "the Vagabond 17 small cabin but it is roomy enough for a couple or a small family. With a galley and private head it is great for short overnight trips. It has a locking swing keel which makes for easy launching and beaching."

See also
List of sailing boat types

Related development
Holder 17

Similar sailboats
Buzzards Bay 14
Siren 17

References

Keelboats
1970s sailboat type designs
Sailing yachts
Trailer sailers
Sailboat type designs by Ron Holder
Sailboat types built by Vagabond Boats